Dr. Joseph Kariyil B.A., S.T.D (born January 11, 1949) is an Indian Bishop of the Roman Catholic Church, born on 11 January 1949 in Arthunkal, near Alleppey. He was ordained a priest on 19 December 1973. He was appointed as the Bishop of Punalur on 12 March 2005 and was consecrated on 3 May 2005. He was appointed Bishop of Cochin on 8 May 2009. He was installed as the Bishop of Cochin on 5 July 2009.

He studied at Alphonciano Academy, Rome, Italy. He served the Church in the capacities of an assistant Vicar, Vicar and the editor of Talent Magazine. He also served as the Director of Pastoral Orientation Centre and as the Vicar General of Cochin diocese.

See also
Diocese of Cochin
Catholic Bishops' Conference of India
Christianity in India
Roman Catholicism in India
List of Roman Catholic dioceses in India
List of Roman Catholic dioceses (structured_view)-Episcopal Conference of India

Notes

References
 Official Diocese of Cochin website | Bishop Joseph Kariyil
 Diocesan directory | www.ucanews.com
www.gcatholic.org | Bishop Joseph Kariyil
www.catholic-hierarchy.org | Bishop Joseph Kariyil

External links

 www.cochindiocesanbulletin.org – Bishop Joseph Kariyil was installed as the 35th Bishop of Cochin Diocese
CBCI official website
CBCI picture gallery
News Site of the Catholic Bishop's Conference

1949 births
Living people
People from Alappuzha district
21st-century Roman Catholic bishops in India